Sedum mexicanum, commonly known as the Mexican stonecrop, is a flowering plant in the family Crassulaceae.

References

mexicanum